is a former town which was located in Akita, Japan. Kakumagawa merged into Ōmagari on April 1, 1955, and Ōmagari merged into Daisen on March 22, 2005.

Dissolved municipalities of Akita Prefecture